Yangju Station is a train station on Seoul Subway Line 1 and the Gyeongwon Line. The name comes from Yangju, the city where this station is located. Until December 2007, it was called Junae Station.

Platforms
 Platform 1: to Ganeung / Seoul Station / Kwangwoon University / Incheon
 Platform 2: to Ganeung / Seoul Station / Kwangwoon University / Incheon
 Platform 3: to Soyosan / Dongducheon
 Platform 4: to Soyosan / Dongducheon

Exits
 Exit 1: Junae Post Office, Yangju 1-dong Community Center, Nambang 1-ri Community Center
 Exit 2: Pyeonghwa-ro, Nambanggyo

References 

Seoul Metropolitan Subway stations
Metro stations in Yangju
Railway stations opened in 1948